, also known as Dragon-Zakura, is a Japanese live action television series based on the manga of the same name.

Cast

Teachers
 Hiroshi Abe as Kenji Sakuragi, a lawyer and the homeroom teacher for the special class
 Kyōko Hasegawa as Mamako Ino, an English teacher from Ryūzan High School. She takes care of History lessons for the special class.
 Yōko Nogiwa as Yuriko Tatsuno, the director of Ryūzan High School and the wife of former owner
  as Tokihisa Kondō, the vice-principal of Ryūzan High School.
 David Ito as Masanao Ochiai, a teacher from Ryūzan High School
 Tōru Shinagawa as Tetsunosuke Yanagi, the Mathematics teacher for the special class
 Minori Terada - Ryūzaburō Akutayama, the Japanese language teacher for the special class
 Susumu Kobayashi as Shutaro Ain, the Science teacher for the special class
 Akio Kaneda as Hiroshi Kawaguchi, the English language teacher for the special class
 Shin Yazawa as Nozomi Yamamoto, Mamako's friend and a teacher of Shūmeikan High School.

Students of the special class
 Tomohisa Yamashita as Yūsuke Yajima
 Masami Nagasawa as Naomi Mizuno
 Teppei Koike as Hideki Ogata
 Yui Aragaki as Yoshino Kōsaka
 Akiyoshi Nakao as Ichirō Okuno
 Saeko as Maki Kobayashi

Family members of special class students
 Mako Ishino as Setsuko Yajima, Yūsuke's mother
 Jun Miho as Yūko Mizuno, Naomi's mother
 Kei Sunaga as Kōsei Ogata, Hideki's father
 Tomoko Aihara as Mariko Ogata, Hideki's mother
 Yōko Kurita as Megumi Kōsaka, Yoshino's mother
 Kazuko Katō as Miyako Okuno, Ichirō's mother
 Momosuke Mizutani as Jirō Okuno, Ichirō's twin brother. He is a student of Shūmeikan High School)
 Nobue Iketani as Mitsue Kobayashi, Maki's mother

Other students of Ryūzan High School
 Akari Hori as Asumi Toda, an idol who repeatedly sends Maki e-mails from her workplace
 Ayano Gunji as Saori Abe, Naomi's friend. She had requested Naomi to introduce her to Yūsuke

Others
 Hiroki Murakami as Yoshio Tanaka, one of Nozomi's suitors. He is a law graduate of Tokyo University. An arrogant man, he is proud of his academic and social standing even though he is neither handsome nor fit.
 Mitsuru Karahashi as Yasushi Sawamatsu, the second suitor of Nozomi. A high school dropout, he is rather simple-minded with "awesome" as his favorite phrase and a very limited vocabulary. His favorite pastime is playing Pachinko and he only has a part-time job.

Episodes

Theme song
The theme song of the show is "Realize" by melody. and the insert song "Colorful" by Tomohisa Yamashita.

References

External links 
  

2005 Japanese television series debuts
Kin'yō Dorama
2005 Japanese television series endings
Japanese television dramas based on manga
Examinations and testing in fiction
Dragon Zakura